A calico cat is a domestic cat of any breed with a tri-color coat. The calico cat is most commonly thought of as being 25% to 75% white with large orange and black patches, however, they may have other colors in their patterns. Sometimes a variation occurs with cream and grey patches that is called a muted calico. Calicoes are almost exclusively female except under rare genetic conditions.

A calico cat is not to be confused with a tortoiseshell, which has a black undercoat and a mostly mottled coat of black/orange or grey/cream with relatively few to no white markings. However, outside North America, the calico pattern is more commonly called tortoiseshell and white. In the province of Quebec, Canada, they are sometimes called chatte d'Espagne (French for '(female) cat of Spain'). Other names include brindle, tricolor cat, mikeneko (三毛猫) (Japanese for 'triple fur cat'), samsaek goyangi (삼색 고양이) (Korean for 'three colored cat'), and lapjeskat (Dutch for 'patches cat'); calicoes with diluted coloration have been called calimanco or clouded tiger. Occasionally, the tri-color calico coloration is combined with a tabby patterning; this calico-patched tabby may be called a caliby.

Derived from a colorful printed Calico fabric, when the term "calico" is applied to cats it refers only to a color pattern of the fur, not to a cat breed or any reference to any other traits, such as their eyes. Formal standards set by professional and show animal breeders limit the breeds among which they permit registration of cats with calico coloration; those breeds are the Manx cat, American Shorthair, Maine Coon, British Shorthair, Persian cat, Arabian Mau, Japanese Bobtail, Exotic Shorthair, Siberian, Turkish Van, Turkish Angora, and Norwegian Forest cat.

Because the genetic determination of coat colors in calico cats is linked to the X chromosome, calicoes are nearly always female, with one color linked to the maternal X chromosome and a second color linked to the paternal X chromosome. In most cases, males are only one color (for instance, black) as they have only one X chromosome. Male calicoes can happen when a male cat has two X chromosomes (Klinefelter syndrome, with XXY sex chromosomes and generally they are sterile); the condition is a chimera, with two different cell types; or, rarely, when some skin cells of the developing kitten spontaneously mutate.

Some calico cats, called "dilute calicoes", may be lighter in color overall. Dilutes are distinguished by having grey (known as blue), cream, and gold colors instead of the typical colors along with the white.

History 
The tri-color coat characteristic of calico cats does not define any breed, but occurs incidentally in cats who express a range of color patterns; accordingly, the effect has no definitive historical background. However, the existence of patches in calico cats was traced to a certain degree by Neil Todd in a study determining the migration of domesticated cats along trade routes in Europe and Northern Africa. The proportion of cats having the orange mutant gene found in calicoes was traced to the port cities along the Mediterranean in Greece, France, Spain, and Italy, originating from Egypt. 

The calico has been Maryland's state cat since 1 October 2001. Calico cats were chosen as the state cat because their white, black, and orange coloring is in harmony with the coloring of the Baltimore oriole (the state bird) and the Baltimore checkerspot butterfly (the state insect).

Etymology 
The fabric called "calico" was originally from the city of Calicut in southwestern India. Printed calico was imported into the United States from Lancashire, England, in the 1780s, and a linguistic separation occurred there. While Europe maintained the word calico for the fabric, in the USA it was used to refer to the printed design or pattern. These colorful, small-patterned printed fabrics gave rise to the use of the word calico to describe a cat coat of tri-color; "calico" as an adjective being synonymous to "mottled" or "resembling printed calico".

Genetics 

In genetic terms, calico cats resemble tortoiseshells in most ways, except the tortoiseshell has a black undercoat and the calico has a white undercoat. One anomaly is that, as a rule of thumb the larger the areas of white, the fewer and larger the patches of ginger and dark or tabby coat. In contrast, a non-white-spotted tortoiseshell usually has small patches of color or even something resembling a salt-and-pepper sprinkling. This reflects the genetic effects on relative speeds of migration of melanocytes and X-inactivation in the embryo.

Serious study of calico cats apparently began in 1948 when Murray Barr and his graduate student E. G. Bertram noticed dark, drumstick-shaped masses inside the nuclei of nerve cells of female cats, but not in male cats. These dark masses became known as Barr bodies. In 1959, Japanese cell biologist Susumu Ohno determined the Barr bodies were X chromosomes. In 1961, Mary Lyon proposed the concept of X-inactivation: when one of the two X chromosomes inside a female mammal shuts off. She observed this in the coat color patterns of mice. There are two different alleles in Calico cats, one received from each parent, that can determine their fur coloration: each allele is responsible for either orange or black fur. Typically, each allele received would create a solid coat of black and orange fur, but, with Calico cats, Lyonization (commonly known as X-inactivation), occurs at random, which makes for the very distinct fur coat.

Calico cats are almost always female because the locus of the gene for the orange/non-orange coloring is on the X chromosome. In the absence of other influences, such as color inhibition that causes white fur, the alleles present in those orange loci determine whether the fur is orange or not. Female cats, like all female placental mammals, normally have two X chromosomes. In contrast, male placental mammals, including chromosomally stable male cats, have one X and one Y chromosome. Since the Y chromosome does not have any locus for the orange gene, it is not possible for a normal XY male cat to have both orange and non-orange genes together, which is what typically results in tortoiseshell or calico coloring.

One rare genetic exception resulting in a male calico is when faulty cell division leaves an extra X chromosome in one of the gametes that produced the male cat. That extra X then is reproduced in each of his cells, a condition referred to as XXY, or Klinefelter syndrome. Such a combination of chromosomes could produce tortoiseshell or calico markings in the affected male, in the same way as XX chromosomes produce them in the female.

All but approximately one in three thousand of the rare calico or tortoiseshell male cats are sterile because of the chromosome abnormality and breeders reject any exceptions for stud purposes because they generally are of poor physical quality and fertility. Even in the rare cases where a male calico is healthy and fertile, most cat registries will not accept them as show animals.

As Sue Hubble stated in her book Shrinking the Cat: Genetic Engineering Before We Knew About Genes,

The mutation that gives male cats a ginger-colored coat and females ginger, tortoiseshell, or calico coats produced a particularly telling map. The orange mutant gene is found only on the X, or female, chromosome. As with humans, female cats have paired sex chromosomes, XX, and male cats have XY sex chromosomes. The female cat, therefore, can have the orange mutant gene on one X chromosome and the gene for a black coat on the other. The piebald gene is on a different chromosome. If expressed, this gene codes for white, or no color, and is dominant over the alleles that code for a certain color (i.e. orange or black), making the white spots on calico cats. If that is the case, those several genes will be expressed in a blotchy coat of the tortoiseshell or calico kind. But the male, with his single X chromosome, has only one of that particular coat-color gene: he can be not-ginger or he can be ginger (although some modifier genes can add a bit of white here and there), but unless he has a chromosomal abnormality he cannot be a calico cat.

Currently, it has been very difficult to reproduce the fur patterns of calico cats by cloning. Penelope Tsernoglou wrote that this "...is due to an effect called x-linked inactivation which involves the random inactivation of one of the X chromosomes. Since all female mammals have two X chromosomes, one might wonder if this phenomenon could have a more widespread impact on cloning in the future."

The study of Calico cats may have provided significant findings relating to physiological differences between female and male mammals.

Folklore 
Cats with calico coloration are believed to bring good luck in the folklore of many cultures. In Germany, the word for a cat with calico coloring is "Glückskatze" or "lucky cat". In the United States, calicoes sometimes are referred to as money cats. In Japan, Maneki-neko figures depict calico cats, bringing good luck. Japanese sailors often kept a calico as their ship's cat to protect against misfortune at sea.

Literature  
In the late nineteenth century, Eugene Field published "The Duel", a poem for children also known as "The Gingham Dog and the Calico Cat".

See also 
 Bicolor cat
 Brindle
 Cat coat genetics
 Deaf white cat
 Maltese cat
 Point coloration
 Tabby cat
 Tortoiseshell cat

References

External links 
 

Cat coat types
Symbols of Maryland